Jimmy Cundasamy (born July 14, 1977 in Mauritius) is a football player who currently plays for US Stade Tamponnaise in the Réunion Premier League and for the Mauritius national football team as a midfielder. He is featured on the Mauritian national team in the official 2010 FIFA World Cup video game.

References

External links

1977 births
Living people
Mauritius international footballers
Mauritian footballers
Mauritian expatriate footballers
Expatriate footballers in Réunion
Mauritian expatriate sportspeople in Réunion
La Tamponnaise players
JS Saint-Pierroise players
Association football midfielders
SS Saint-Louisienne players